The Fresno Bee is a daily newspaper serving Fresno, California, and surrounding counties in that U.S. state's central San Joaquin Valley. It is owned by The McClatchy Company and ranks fourth in circulation among the company's newspapers. It is currently headquartered in the Bitwise 41 building at 2721 Ventura Street.

The Fresno Bee was founded in 1922 by the McClatchy brothers Charles Kenny (C. K.) and Valentine Stuart (V. S.), sons of The Sacramento Bee's second editor James McClatchy. C. K.'s only son Carlos McClatchy became The Fresno Bee's first editor. The two Central Valley newspapers, closely linked by family ownership and editorial philosophy, formed the core of what later grew into The McClatchy Company. In 1932, the McClatchys purchased an older Fresno newspaper, The Republican. The Fresno Republican had been founded in 1876, by Dr. Chester A. Rowell and a group of investors that included inventor and entrepreneur Frank Dusy. In 1932, The Fresno Bee took over the subscription lists of The Fresno Republican and merged the newspapers.

The Fresno Bee began publishing the Spanish newspaper Vida en el Valle in 1990. The paper launched its website in 1996; in November 2005, the paper integrated its online operations into the paper's other departments.

In 2004, The Fresno Bee purchased the Sierra Star in Oakhurst.

Since 2017, the paper's relationship with their hometown representative Devin Nunes has deteriorated. Nunes took issue with several op-eds the paper had published on his handling of Russian interference in the 2016 elections. Nunes responded by airing TV ads attacking the paper and mailing constituents a 40-page glossy pamphlet solely focused on attacking The Bee's reputation.

Originally founded at the historic Fresno Bee Building, it has moved throughout Downtown Fresno over the years. In March 2020, The Fresno Bee moved from their headquarters of nearly 40 years at 1626 E Street to Bitwise 41 at 2721 Ventura St., Fresno, CA 93721 owned by Bitwise Industries.

See also

References

External links 
 

1922 establishments in California
Daily newspapers published in California
Mass media in Fresno County, California
Mass media in Fresno, California
McClatchy publications
Publications established in 1922
San Joaquin Valley